Kirk Alan Triplett (born March 29, 1962) is an American professional golfer who has played on the PGA Tour, Nationwide Tour, and PGA Tour Champions.

Early years
Born in Moses Lake, Washington, Triplett grew up on the Palouse in Pullman and graduated from Pullman High School  He accepted a golf scholarship to the University of Nevada  and earned a degree in civil engineering. Triplett became a golf professional in 1985 and played on tours in Australia, Asia, and Canada. He qualified for the U.S. Open in 1986 and 1987, but missed the cuts.

PGA Tour
In his fourth attempt, Triplett earned his PGA Tour card in December 1989 at the qualifying tournament near Houston, and was a rookie in 1990. He won three events during his career: the Nissan Open in 2000, the Reno-Tahoe Open in 2003, and the Chrysler Classic of Tucson in 2006. He was also a runner-up five times: Houston Open (1992), Buick Invitational (1995), John Deere Classic (2000), Michelob Championship at Kingsmill (2001), and Bay Hill Invitational (2003).

A member of the Presidents Cup team in 2000, Triplett claimed three wins and halved in singles as the U.S. won  His career best Official World Golf Ranking was 25th in June 2000.

Triplett's best result in a major championship was a tie for sixth at the Masters, in 2001 and 2004. The latter included a hole in one, late in the fourth round at the par-3 16th (Redbud); in the preceding pairing ten minutes earlier, Pádraig Harrington had also aced it.

Nationwide Tour
In 2009, Triplett finished outside the top 150 on the money list and lost his PGA Tour playing card. On the Nationwide Tour in 2011, he won the News Sentinel Open at age 49 to become that tour's oldest winner ever.

PGA Tour Champions
Eligible to play on the Champions Tour in 2012 after March 29, Triplett won in his eighth attempt on July 9, at the Nature Valley First Tee Open at Pebble Beach. He entered the final round four strokes behind, but shot a final round 66 to surge through the pack and prevail by two strokes over Mark McNulty. The win made him the sixth player to win on all the PGA Tour sponsored tours (PGA Tour, Web.com Tour, and Champions Tour). He successfully defended the title in 2013 for his second Champions Tour win. 

Triplett shot a tournament record 9-under-par at the Principal Charity Classic at West Glen Oaks Country Club in Des Moines, Iowa. Through December 2018, he has six wins on the PGA Tour Champions.

Triplett is also part owner of a hole in one insurance company called Hole In One International in conjunction with President/CEO Mark Gilmartin.

In March 2019, Triplett won the Hoag Classic in Newport Beach, California in a playoff over Woody Austin. Playing the par-5 18th hole at Newport Beach Country Club for the third time on the final day of the tournament, Triplett holed an 18-foot eagle putt for his seventh PGA Tour Champions victory.

In September 2019, Triplett won the PURE Insurance Championship at Pebble Beach Golf Links in a playoff over Billy Andrade.

Professional wins (17)

PGA Tour wins (3)

PGA Tour playoff record (0–1)

Nationwide Tour wins (1)

Canadian Tour wins (2)

Other wins (3)
1988 Sierra Nevada Open
1991 California State Open
1996 Merrill Lynch Pebble Beach Invitational

PGA Tour Champions wins (8)

PGA Tour Champions playoff record (3–1)

Results in major championships

WD = withdrew
CUT = missed the half-way cut
"T" = tied

Summary

Most consecutive cuts made – 7 (2000 U.S. Open – 2001 PGA)
Longest streak of top-10s – 3 (2001 Masters – 2001 PGA)

Results in The Players Championship

CUT = missed the halfway cut
"T" indicates a tie for a place

Results in World Golf Championships

1Cancelled due to 9/11

QF, R16, R32, R64 = Round in which player lost in match play
"T" = Tied
DQ = disqualified
NT = No tournament

Results in senior major championships
Results not in chronological order before 2022.

CUT = missed the halfway cut
WD = withdrew
"T" indicates a tie for a place
NT = No tournament due to COVID-19 pandemic

U.S. national team appearances
Professional
Presidents Cup: 2000 (winners)

See also 

 1989 PGA Tour Qualifying School graduates

References

External links

American male golfers
Nevada Wolf Pack men's golfers
PGA Tour golfers
PGA Tour Champions golfers
Golfers from Washington (state)
Golfers from Scottsdale, Arizona
People from Moses Lake, Washington
People from Pullman, Washington
1962 births
Living people